Kyle Wieche (born July 30, 1967 in Hartford, Connecticut) is an American former alpine skier who competed in the 1992 Winter Olympics.  He was raised in Farmington, Connecticut.

External links
 sports-reference.com
 

1967 births
Living people
American male alpine skiers
Olympic alpine skiers of the United States
Alpine skiers at the 1992 Winter Olympics
Sportspeople from Hartford, Connecticut
People from Farmington, Connecticut
20th-century American people